Brion Curran (born May 27, 1985) is an American politician serving in the Minnesota House of Representatives since 2023. A member of the Minnesota Democratic-Farmer-Labor Party (DFL), Curran represents District 36B in the north Twin Cities metropolitan area, which includes the cities of White Bear Lake and Vadnais Heights and parts of Ramsey and Washington Counties in Minnesota.

Early life, education and career 
Curran was born in Saint Paul, Minnesota, and raised in Centerville. After graduating from Centennial High School, she earned an associate of applied sciences degree in law enforcement from Century College and a Bachelor of Science in criminal justice from Concordia University, St. Paul. 

From 2008 to 2018, Curran worked as assistant to the director of finance at Northeast Residence, a non-profit that supports adults with disabilities. She then joined White Bear Lake Police Department, serving as a volunteer police sergeant from 2015 to 2018 and as a 911 dispatcher from 2017 to 2018. Curran served as a deputy in the Chisago County Sheriff's Office in 2018 before returning to Northeast Residence as a human resources generalist.

Minnesota House of Representatives 
Curran was first elected to the Minnesota House of Representatives in 2022, after redistricting and the retirement of DFL incumbent Ami Wazlawik. Curran serves as vice-chair of the Sustainable Infrastructure Policy Committee, and sits on the Human Services Policy, Judiciary Finance and Civil Law, and Public Safety Finance and Policy Committees.

Electoral history

Personal life 
Curran lives in Vadnais Heights, Minnesota with her wife, Brandi.

References

External links 

Living people
People from Saint Paul, Minnesota
People from Anoka County, Minnesota
Concordia University (Saint Paul, Minnesota) alumni
Minnesota Democrats
Members of the Minnesota House of Representatives
Women state legislators in Minnesota
Year of birth missing (living people)